The dwarf dtella (Gehyra minuta) is a species of gecko endemic to the Northern Territory in Australia.

References

Gehyra
Reptiles described in 1982
Geckos of Australia